"A Cottage for Sale" is a popular song.  The music was composed by Willard Robison, and the lyrics were written by Larry Conley. The song was first published in 1929, and over 100 performers have recorded versions of "A Cottage for Sale."  The first versions of the song were released by The Revelers in January 1930 and Bernie Cummins with the New Yorker Orchestra in March 1930.

Lyrics and Themes
The song uses an empty cottage as a metaphor of a failed relationship or the end of a long relationship perhaps in death.

Our little dream castle
With every dream gone
Is lonely and silent
The shades are all drawn
And my heart is heavy
As I gaze upon 
A cottage for sale

The lawn we were proud of 
Is waving in hay
Our beautiful garden has
Withered away. 
Where we planted roses
The weeds seem to say...
A cottage for sale

Through every window
I see your face
But when I reach (the) window
There's (only) empty space

The key's in the mailbox
The same as before
But no one is waiting for me anymore
The end of our story
Is there on the door
A cottage for sale.

Recordings
The song has become a standard, with artists from a variety of genres creating many notable recordings. A partial list follows:
1930: Victor vocal quartet The Revelers
1930: Ruth Etting 
1930: Grey Gull Studio Dance Band with vocalist Jack Parker (Piccadilly 616 / 3990-B)
1930: Guy Lombardo
1945: Billy Eckstine and His Orchestra went to number three on the Most-Played Juke Box Race Records chart and number eight on the pop chart. 
1947: Mel Torme
1956: Dinah Washington ("Dinah!" album)
1957: Nat King Cole ("Just One of Those Things" album)
1957: Coleman Hawkins with an orchestra arranged and conducted by Glenn Osser ("The Gilded Hawk" album)
1958: Tony Bennett with Frank De Vol and his Orchestra ("Long Ago and Far Away" album)
1958: Frankie Laine
1959: Frank Sinatra ("No One Cares" album)
1959: Roy Hamilton ("Have Blues Must Travel" album)
1959: Chris Connor ("Nina Simone and Her Friends" album)
1960: Little Willie John ("Sure Things" album)
1960: Billy Eckstine ("Once More with Feeling" album)
1961: Howard McGhee ("Dusty Blue" album)
1963: Julie London ("Love on the Rocks" LP album Liberty Records LST 7249)
1963: Judy Garland
1965: Jack Teagarden ("Think Well Of Me" Verve Records V6 8465 album)
1968: Kay Starr and Count Basie ("How About This" album) 
1968: James Brown ("Thinking About Little Willie John and a Few Nice Things" album) 
1969: Bette McLaurin ("The Masquerade Is Over" album)
1978: Bill Farrell ("Lush Life" album)
1987: Chuck Berry sings the song, accompanied Johnnie Johnson on piano, in an intimate moment during rehearsal in his concert film Hail! Hail! Rock 'n' Roll
1992: Buddy Montgomery ("Live at Maybeck Recital Hall, Volume Fifteen" album)
1995: Etta Jones ("At Last" album)
1996: Jackie McLean ("Hat Trick" album)
2001: Dave Van Ronk ("Sweet & Lowdown" album)
2003: Jerry Jeff Walker ("Jerry Jeff Jazz" album)
2003: Holly Cole ("Shade" album)
2005: Les Deux Love Orchestra ("King Kong" album, featuring Bobby Woods on vocals and Page Cavanaugh on piano)
2005: Johnny Mathis ("Isn't It Romantic: The Standards Album")
2010: Freddy Cole ("Freddy Cole Sings Mr. B")
2017: The Newfangled Four ("The Newfangled Four" album)
2021: Willie Nelson ("That's Life" album, Nelson's second tribute album to Frank Sinatra)
2023 :  Lucy Yeghiazaryan  ("Lonely House" album)

Other performances, date unknown:
Teresa Brewer
Vic Dickenson
Jackie Gleason
Jack Hylton
Peggy Lee
Della Reese
Tiny Tim

References

Songs with music by Willard Robison
1929 songs
Guy Lombardo songs